A firearm is any type of gun designed to be readily carried and used by an individual. The term is legally defined further in different countries (see Legal definitions).

The first firearms originated in 10th-century China, when bamboo tubes containing gunpowder and pellet projectiles were mounted on spears to make the portable fire lance, operable by a single person, which was later used effectively as a shock weapon in the siege of De'an in 1132. In the 13th century, fire lance barrels were replaced with metal tubes and transformed into the metal-barreled hand cannon. The technology gradually spread throughout Eurasia during the 14th century. Older firearms typically used black powder as a propellant, but modern firearms use smokeless powder or other propellants. Most modern firearms (with the notable exception of smoothbore shotguns) have rifled barrels to impart spin to the projectile for improved flight stability.

Modern firearms can be described by their caliber (i.e. bore diameter). For pistols and rifles this is given in millimeters or inches (e.g. 7.62mm or .308 in.), or in the case of shotguns by their gauge (e.g. 12 ga. and 20 ga.). They are also described by the type of action employed (e.g. muzzleloader, breechloader, lever, bolt, pump, revolver, semi-automatic, fully automatic, etc.), together with the usual means of deportment (i.e. hand-held or mechanical mounting). Further classification may make reference to the type of barrel used (i.e. rifled) and to the barrel length (e.g. 24 inches), to the firing mechanism (e.g. matchlock, wheellock, flintlock, or percussion lock), to the design's primary intended use (e.g. hunting rifle), or to the commonly accepted name for a particular variation (e.g. Gatling gun).

Shooters aim firearms at their targets with hand-eye coordination, using either iron sights or optical sights. The accurate range of pistols generally does not exceed , while most rifles are accurate to  using iron sights, or to longer ranges whilst using optical sights. (Firearm rounds may be dangerous or lethal well beyond their accurate range; the minimum distance for safety is much greater than the specified range for accuracy).

Types

A firearm is a barreled ranged weapon that inflicts damage on targets by launching one or more projectiles driven by rapidly expanding high-pressure gas produced by exothermic combustion (deflagration) of a chemical propellant, historically black powder, now smokeless powder.

In the military, firearms are categorized into heavy and light weapons regarding their portability by infantry.  Light firearms are those that can be readily carried by individual foot soldier, though they might still require more than one individual (crew-served) to achieve optimal operational capacity.  Heavy firearms are those that are too large and heavy to be transported on foot, or too unstable against recoil, and thus require the support of a weapons platform (e.g. a fixed mount, wheeled carriage, vehicle, aircraft or water vessel) to be tactically mobile or useful.

The subset of light firearms that only use kinetic projectiles and are compact enough to be operated to full capacity by a single infantryman (individual-served) are also referred to as small arms.  Such firearms include handguns such as revolvers, pistols and derringers, and long guns such as rifles (including many subtypes such as anti-material rifles, sniper rifles/designated marksman rifles, battle rifles, assault rifles and carbines), shotguns, submachine guns/personal defense weapons and squad automatic weapons/light machine guns.

Among the world's arms manufacturers, the top firearms manufacturers are Browning, Remington, Colt, Ruger, Smith & Wesson, Savage, Mossberg (USA), Heckler & Koch, SIG Sauer, Walther (Germany), ČZUB (Czech Republic), Glock, Steyr-Mannlicher (Austria), FN Herstal (Belgium), Beretta (Italy), Norinco (China), Tula Arms and Kalashnikov (Russia), while former top producers included Mauser, Springfield Armory, and Rock Island Armory under Armscor (Philippines).

 the Small Arms Survey reported that there were over one billion firearms distributed globally, of which 857 million (about 85 percent) were in civilian hands. U.S. civilians alone account for 393 million (about 46 percent) of the worldwide total of civilian-held firearms. This amounts to "120.5 firearms for every 100 residents". The world's armed forces control about 133 million (about 13 percent) of the global total of small arms, of which over 43 percent belong to two countries: the Russian Federation (30.3 million) and China (27.5 million). Law enforcement agencies control about 23 million (about 2 percent) of the global total of small arms.

Configuration

Handguns

Handguns are guns that can be used with a single hand and are the smallest of all firearms.  However, the legal definition of a "handgun" varies between countries and regions.  For example, in South African law, a "handgun" means a pistol or revolver which can be held and discharged with one hand. In Australia, the gun law considers a handgun as a firearm carry-able or concealable about the person; or capable of being raised and fired by one hand; or not exceeding . In the United States, Title 18 and the ATF considers a handgun as a firearm which has a short stock and is designed to be held and fired by the use of a single hand.

There are two common types of handguns: revolvers and semi-automatic pistols. Revolvers have a number of firing chambers or "charge holes" in a revolving cylinder; each chamber in the cylinder is loaded with a single cartridge or charge. Semi-automatic pistols have a single fixed firing chamber machined into the rear of the barrel, and a magazine so they can be used to fire more than one round. Each press of the trigger fires a cartridge, using the energy of the cartridge to activate a mechanism so that the next cartridge may be fired immediately. This is opposed to "double-action" revolvers, which accomplish the same end using a mechanical action linked to the trigger pull.

With the invention of the revolver in 1818, handguns capable of holding multiple rounds became popular. Certain designs of auto-loading pistols appeared beginning in the 1870s and had largely supplanted revolvers in military applications by the end of World War I. By the end of the 20th century, most handguns carried regularly by military, police, and civilians were semi-automatic, although revolvers were still widely used. Generally speaking, military and police forces use semi-automatic pistols due to their high magazine capacities and ability to rapidly reload by simply removing the empty magazine and inserting a loaded one. Revolvers are very common among handgun hunters because revolver cartridges are usually more powerful than similar caliber semi-automatic pistol cartridges (which are designed for self-defense) and the strength, simplicity, and durability of the revolver design is well-suited to outdoor use. Revolvers, especially in .22 LR and 38 Special/357 Magnum, are also common concealed weapons in jurisdictions allowing this practice because their simple mechanics make them smaller than many autoloaders while remaining reliable. Both designs are common among civilian gun owners, depending on the owner's intention (self-defense, hunting, target shooting, competitions, collecting, etc.).

Long guns

Unlike a handgun, long guns are designed to be held and fired with both hands, while braced against either the hip or the shoulder for better stability. The receiver and trigger group is mounted into a stock made of wood, plastic, metal, or composite material, which has sections that form a foregrip, rear grip, and optionally (but typically) a shoulder mount called the butt. Early long arms, from the Renaissance up to the mid-19th century, were generally smoothbore firearms that fired one or more ball shot, called muskets or arquebus depending on caliber and firing mechanism.

Rifles and shotguns

Most modern long guns are either rifles or shotguns. Both are the successors of the musket, diverging from their parent weapon in distinct ways. A rifle is so named for the spiral grooves (riflings) machined into the inner (bore) surface of its barrel, which imparts a gyroscopically-stabilizing spin to the bullets that it fires.  Shotguns are predominantly smoothbore firearms designed to fire a number of shot in each discharge; pellet sizes commonly ranging between 2 mm #9 birdshot and 8.4 mm #00 (double-aught) buckshot.  Shotguns are also capable of firing single solid projectiles called slugs, or specialty (often "less lethal") rounds such as bean bags, tear gas or breaching rounds.  Rifles produce a single point of impact with each firing but a long range and high accuracy; while shotguns produce a cluster of impact points with considerably less range and accuracy.  However, the larger impact area of shotguns can compensate for reduced accuracy, since shot spreads during flight; consequently, in hunting, shotguns are generally used for fast-flying game birds.

Rifles and shotguns are commonly used for hunting and often also for home defense, security, and law enforcement. Usually, large game are hunted with rifles (although shotguns can be used, particularly with slugs), while birds are hunted with shotguns. Shotguns are sometimes preferred for defending a home or business due to their wide impact area, multiple wound tracks (when using buckshot), shorter range, and reduced penetration of walls (when using lighter shot), which significantly reduces the likelihood of unintended harm, although the handgun is also common.

There are a variety of types of rifles and shotguns based on the method in which they are reloaded. Bolt-action and lever-action rifles are manually operated. Manipulation of the bolt or the lever causes the spent cartridge to be removed, the firing mechanism recocked, and a fresh cartridge inserted. These two types of action are almost exclusively used by rifles. Slide-action (commonly called 'pump-action') rifles and shotguns are manually cycled by shuttling the foregrip of the firearm back and forth. This type of action is typically used by shotguns, but several major manufacturers make rifles that use this action.

Both rifles and shotguns also come in break-action varieties that do not have any kind of reloading mechanism at all but must be hand-loaded after each shot. Both rifles and shotguns come in single- and double-barreled varieties; however, due to the expense and difficulty of manufacturing, double-barreled rifles are rare. Double-barreled rifles are typically intended for African big-game hunts where the animals are dangerous, ranges are short, and speed is of the essence. Very large and powerful calibers are normal for these firearms.

Rifles have been in nationally featured marksmanship events in Europe and the United States since at least the 18th century when rifles were first becoming widely available. One of the earliest purely "American" rifle-shooting competitions took place in 1775 when Daniel Morgan was recruiting sharpshooters in Virginia for the impending American Revolutionary War. In some countries, rifle marksmanship is still a matter of national pride. In the second half of the 20th century, competitive shotgun sports became perhaps even more popular than riflery, largely due to the motion and immediate feedback in activities such as skeet, trap, and sporting clays.

In military use, bolt-action rifles with high-power scopes are common as sniper rifles, however by the Korean War the traditional bolt-action and semi-automatic rifles used by infantrymen had been supplemented by select-fire designs known as automatic rifles.

Carbines

A carbine is a firearm similar to a rifle in form and intended usage, but generally shorter or smaller than the typical "full-size" hunting or battle rifle of a similar time period, and sometimes using a smaller or less-powerful cartridge. Carbines were and are typically used by members of the military in roles that are expected to engage in combat, but where a full-size rifle would be an impediment to the primary duties of that soldier (vehicle drivers, field commanders and support staff, airborne troops, engineers, etc.). Carbines are also common in law enforcement and among civilian owners where similar size, space, and/or power concerns may exist. Carbines, like rifles, can be single-shot, repeating-action, semi-automatic, or select-fire/fully automatic, generally depending on the time period and intended market. Common historical examples include the Winchester Model 1892, Lee–Enfield "Jungle Carbine", SKS, M1 carbine (no relation to the larger M1 Garand) and M4 carbine (a more compact variant of the current M16 rifle). Modern U.S. civilian carbines include compact customizations of the AR-15, Ruger Mini-14, Beretta Cx4 Storm, Kel-Tec SUB-2000, bolt-action rifles generally falling under the specifications of a scout rifle, and aftermarket conversion kits for popular pistols including the M1911 and Glock models.

Machine guns

A machine gun is a fully automatic firearm, most often separated from other classes of automatic weapons by the use of belt-fed ammunition (though some designs employ drum, pan or hopper magazines), generally in a rifle-inspired caliber ranging between 5.56×45mm NATO (.223 Remington) for a light machine gun to as large as .50 BMG or even larger for crewed or aircraft weapons. Although not widely fielded until World War I, early machine guns were being used by militaries in the second half of the 19th century. Notables in the U.S. arsenal during the 20th century included the M2 Browning .50 caliber heavy machine gun, M1919 Browning .30 caliber medium machine gun, and the M60 7.62×51mm NATO general-purpose machine gun which came into use around the Vietnam War. Machine guns of this type were originally defensive firearms crewed by at least two men, mainly because of the difficulties involved in moving and placing them, their ammunition, and their tripod. In contrast, modern light machine guns such as the FN Minimi are often wielded by a single infantryman. They provide a large ammunition capacity and a high rate of fire and are typically used to give suppressing fire during infantry movement. The accuracy of machine guns varies based on a wide number of factors from design to manufacturing tolerances, most of which have been improved over time. Machine guns are often mounted on vehicles or helicopters and have been used since World War I as offensive firearms in fighter aircraft and tanks (e.g. for air combat or suppressing fire for ground troop support).

The definition of a machine gun is different in U.S. law. The National Firearms Act and Firearm Owners Protection Act define a "machine gun" in the United States code Title 26, Subtitle E, Chapter 53, Subchapter B, Part 1, § 5845 as:
"... any firearm which shoots ... automatically more than one shot, without manual reloading, by a single function of the trigger". "Machine gun" is therefore largely synonymous with "automatic weapon" in the U.S. civilian parlance, covering all automatic firearms.

Sniper rifles

The definition of a sniper rifle is disputed among military, police, and civilian observers alike, however, most generally define a “sniper rifle” as a high-powered, semi-automatic/bolt action, precision rifle with an accurate range further than that of a standard rifle. These are often purpose-built for their applications. For example, a police sniper rifle may differ in specs from a military rifle. Police snipers generally do not engage targets at extreme range, but rather, a target at medium range. They may also have multiple targets within the shorter range, and thus a semi-automatic model is preferred to a bolt action. They also may be more compact than mil-spec rifles as police marksmen may need more portability. On the other hand, a military rifle is more likely to use a higher-powered cartridge to defeat body armor or medium-light cover. They are more commonly (but not a lot more) bolt-action, as they are simpler to build and maintain. Also, due to fewer moving and overall parts, they are much more reliable under adverse conditions. They may also have a more powerful scope to acquire targets further away. Overall, sniper units never became prominent until World War I, when the Germans displayed their usefulness on the battlefield. Since then, they have become irrevocably embedded in warfare. Examples of sniper rifles include the Accuracy International AWM, Sako TRG-42 and the CheyTac M200. Examples of specialized sniper cartridges include the .338 Lapua Magnum, .300 Winchester Magnum, and .408 CheyTac rounds.

Submachine guns

A submachine gun is a magazine-fed firearm, usually smaller than other automatic firearms, that fires pistol-caliber ammunition; for this reason certain submachine guns can also be referred to as machine pistols, especially when referring to handgun-sized designs such as the Škorpion vz. 61 and Glock 18. Well-known examples are the Israeli Uzi and Heckler & Koch MP5 which use the 9×19mm Parabellum cartridge, and the American Thompson submachine gun which fires .45 ACP. Because of their small size and limited projectile penetration compared to high-power rifle rounds, submachine guns are commonly favored by military, paramilitary and police forces for close-quarters engagements such as inside buildings, in urban areas, or in trench complexes.

Submachine guns were originally about the size of carbines. Because they fire pistol ammunition, they have limited long-range use, but in close combat can be used in fully automatic in a controllable manner due to the lighter recoil of the pistol ammunition. They are also extremely inexpensive and simple to build in times of war, enabling a nation to quickly arm its military. In the latter half of the 20th century, submachine guns were being miniaturized to the point of being only slightly larger than some large handguns. The most widely used submachine gun at the end of the 20th century was the Heckler & Koch MP5. The MP5 is actually designated as a "machine pistol" by Heckler & Koch (MP5 stands for Maschinenpistole 5, or Machine Pistol 5), although some reserve this designation for even smaller submachine guns such as the MAC-10 and Glock 18, which are about the size and shape of pistols.

Automatic rifles

An automatic rifle is a magazine-fed firearm, wielded by a single infantryman, that is chambered for rifle cartridges and capable of automatic fire. The M1918 Browning Automatic Rifle was the first U.S. infantry weapon of this type, and was generally used for suppressive or support fire in the role now usually filled by the light machine gun. Other early automatic rifles include the Fedorov Avtomat and the Huot Automatic Rifle. Later, German forces fielded the Sturmgewehr 44 during World War II, a light automatic rifle firing a reduced power "intermediate cartridge". This design was to become the basis for the "assault rifle" subclass of automatic weapons, as contrasted with "battle rifles", which generally fire a traditional "full-power" rifle cartridge.

Assault rifles

In World War II, Germany introduced the StG 44, and brought to the forefront of firearm technology what eventually became the class of firearm most widely adopted by the military, the assault rifle. An assault rifle is usually slightly smaller than a battle rifle such as the American M14, but the chief differences defining an assault rifle are select-fire capability and the use of a rifle round of lesser power, known as an intermediate cartridge.

Soviet engineer Mikhail Kalashnikov quickly adapted the German concept, using a less-powerful 7.62×39mm cartridge derived from the standard 7.62×54mmR Russian battle rifle round, to produce the AK-47, which has become the world's most widely used assault rifle. Soon after World War II, the Automatic Kalashnikov AK-47 assault rifle began to be fielded by the Soviet Union and its allies in the Eastern Bloc, as well as by nations such as China, North Korea, and North Vietnam.

In the United States, the assault rifle design was later in coming; the replacement for the M1 Garand of WWII was another John Garand design chambered for the new 7.62×51mm NATO cartridge; the select-fire M14, which was used by the U.S. military until the 1960s. The significant recoil of the M14, when fired in full-automatic mode, was seen as a problem as it reduced accuracy, and in the 1960s it was replaced by Eugene Stoner's AR-15, which also marked a switch from the powerful .30 caliber cartridges used by the U.S. military up until early in the Vietnam War to the much less powerful but far lighter and light recoiling .223 caliber (5.56mm) intermediate cartridge. The military later designated the AR-15 as the "M16". The civilian version of the M16 continues to be known as the AR-15 and looks exactly like the military version, although to conform to ATF regulations in the U.S., it lacks the mechanism that permits fully automatic fire.

Variants of both the M16 and AK-47 are still in wide international use today, though other automatic rifle designs have since been introduced. A smaller version of the M16A2, the M4 carbine, is widely used by U.S. and NATO tank and vehicle crews, airbornes, support staff, and in other scenarios where space is limited. The IMI Galil, an Israeli-designed weapon based on the action of the AK-47 is in use by Israel, Italy, Burma, the Philippines, Peru, and Colombia. Swiss Arms of Switzerland produces the SIG SG 550 assault rifle used by France, Chile, and Spain among others, and Steyr Mannlicher produces the AUG, a bullpup rifle in use in Austria, Australia, New Zealand, Ireland, and Saudi Arabia among other nations.

Modern designs call for compact weapons retaining firepower. The bullpup design, by mounting the magazine behind the trigger, unifies the accuracy and firepower of the traditional assault rifle with the compact size of the submachine gun (though submachine guns are still used); examples are the French FAMAS and the British SA80.

Personal defense weapons

A recently developed class of firearm is the personal defense weapon or PDW, which is in simplest terms a submachine gun designed to fire ammunitions with ballistic performance similar to rifle cartridges. While a submachine gun is desirable for its compact size and ammunition capacity, its pistol cartridges lack the penetrating capability of a rifle round. Conversely, rifle bullets can pierce light armor and are easier to shoot accurately, but even a carbine such as the Colt M4 is larger and/or longer than a submachine gun, making it harder to maneuver in close quarters. The solution many firearms manufacturers have presented is a weapon resembling a submachine gun in size and general configuration, but which fires a higher-powered armor-penetrating round (often specially designed for the weapon), thus combining the advantages of a carbine and submachine gun. This also earned the PDWs an infrequently used nickname—the submachine carbines. The FN P90 and Heckler & Koch MP7 are the most famous examples of PDWs.

Battle rifles

Battle rifles are another subtype of rifle, usually defined as selective fire rifles that use full power rifle cartridges, examples of which include the 7.62x51mm NATO, 7.92x57mm Mauser, and 7.62x54mmR. These serve similar purposes as assault rifles, as they both are usually employed by ground infantry. However, some prefer battle rifles due to their more powerful cartridge, despite added recoil. Some semi-automatic sniper rifles are configured from battle rifles.

Function

Firearms are also categorized by their functioning cycle or "action" which describes their loading, firing, and unloading cycle.

Manual
The earliest evolution of the firearm, there are many types of manual action firearms. These can be divided into two basic categories: single shot and repeating.

A single shot firearm can only be fired once per equipped barrel before it must be reloaded or charged via an external mechanism or series of steps. A repeating firearm can be fired multiple times, but can only be fired once with each subsequent pull of the trigger or ignite. Between trigger pulls, the firearm's action must be reloaded or charged via an internal mechanism.

Lever action
A gun that has a lever that is pulled down and then back up to expel the old cartridge and then load a new round.

Pump-action
Pump-action weapons are primarily shotguns. Pump-action is created when the user slides a lever (usually a grip) and it brings a new round into the chamber while expelling the old one.

Bolt action
Bolt action is a type of manual firearm action that is operated by directly manipulating the bolt via a bolt handle, which is most commonly placed on the right-hand side of the weapon (as most users are right-handed).

Semi-automatic

A semi-automatic, self-loading, or "auto loader" firearm is one that performs all steps necessary to prepare it for firing again after a single discharge until cartridges are no longer available in the weapon's feed device or magazine. Autoloaders fire one round with each pull of the trigger. Some people confuse the term with "fully automatic" firearms.  (See next.) While some semi-automatic rifles may resemble military-style firearms, they are not properly classified as "Assault Weapons" which refers to those that continue to fire until the trigger is no longer depressed.

Automatic

An automatic firearm, or "fully automatic", "fully auto", or "full auto", is generally defined as one that continues to load and fire cartridges from its magazine as long as the trigger is depressed (and until the magazine is depleted of available ammunition.) The first weapon generally considered in this category is the Gatling gun, originally a carriage-mounted, crank-operated firearm with multiple rotating barrels that was fielded in the American Civil War. The modern trigger-actuated machine gun began with various designs developed in the late 19th century and fielded in World War I, such as the Maxim gun, Lewis gun, and MG 08 "Spandau". Most automatic weapons are classed as long guns (as the ammunition used is of a similar type as for rifles, and the recoil of the weapon's rapid fire is better controlled with two hands), but handgun-sized automatic weapons also exist, generally in the "submachine gun" or "machine pistol" class.

Selective fire

Selective fire, or "select fire", means the capability of a weapon's fire control to be adjusted in either semi-automatic, fully automatic firing modes, or 3-round bursts.  The modes are chosen by means of a selector, which varies depending on the weapon's design.  Some selective-fire weapons have burst fire mechanisms built in to limit the maximum number of shots fired in fully automatic mode, with the most common limits being two or three rounds per trigger pull.  The presence of selective-fire modes on firearms allows more efficient use of ammunition for specific tactical needs, either precision-aimed or suppressive fire.  This capability is most commonly found on military weapons of the 20th and 21st centuries, most notably the assault rifles.

Use as a blunt weapon
Firearms can be used as blunt weapons, particularly in Close-quarters combat, or when ammunition for the firearm has run out. It is also an effective battle strategy when ammunition supply is low since knocking out enemies without firing the gun allows the user to save as much ammunition as possible for later, more critical use.

New recruits of the Israel Defense Forces undergo training on the safe practice of using the M16 assault rifle as a blunt weapon, mainly so that in close-quarter fighting, the weapon cannot be pulled away from them. Other training includes the recruit learning how to jab parts of the body with the muzzle and using the butt stock as a weapon.

Forensic medicine recognizes evidence for various types of  blunt-force injuries produced by firearms. For example, "pistol-whipping" typically leaves semicircular or triangular lacerations of skin produced by the butt of a pistol.

In armed robberies, beating the victims with firearms is a more common way to complete the robbery, rather than shooting or stabbing them.

Examples include:
 "Butt stroking", striking with the butt stock of a firearm.
 Pistol-whipping, striking someone with a handgun.
 Striking with the muzzle end of a firearm without a bayonet attached.

History

The first primitive firearms were invented about 1250 AD in China when the man-portable fire lance (a bamboo or metal tube that could shoot ignited gunpowder) was combined with projectiles such as scrap metal, broken porcelain, or darts/arrows.

An early depiction of a firearm is a sculpture from a cave in Sichuan, China. The sculpture dates to the 12th century and represents a figure carrying a vase-shaped bombard, with flames and a cannonball coming out of it. The oldest surviving gun, a hand cannon made of bronze, has been dated to 1288 because it was discovered at a site in modern-day Acheng District, Heilongjiang, China, where the Yuan Shi records that battles were fought at that time. The firearm had a  barrel of a  diameter, a  chamber for the gunpowder and a socket for the firearm's handle.

The Arabs and Mamluks had firearms in the late-13th century. Europeans obtained firearms in the 14th century. The Koreans adopted firearms from the Chinese in the 14th century. The Iranians (first Aq Qoyunlu and Safavids) and Indians (first Mughals) all got them no later than the 15th century, from the Ottoman Turks. The people of the Nusantara archipelago of Southeast Asia used the long arquebus at least by the last quarter of the 15th century.

Even though the knowledge of making gunpowder-based weapons in the Nusantara archipelago had been known after the failed Mongol invasion of Java (1293), and the predecessor of firearms, the pole gun (bedil tombak), was recorded as being used by Java in 1413, the knowledge of making "true" firearms came much later, after the middle of 15th century. It was brought by the Islamic nations of West Asia, most probably the Arabs. The precise year of introduction is unknown, but it may be safely concluded to be no earlier than 1460. Before the arrival of the Portuguese in Southeast Asia, the natives already possessed firearms, the Java arquebus.

The technology of firearms in Southeast Asia further improved after the Portuguese capture of Malacca (1511). Starting in the 1513, the traditions of German-Bohemian gun-making merged with Turkish gun-making traditions. This resulted in the Indo-Portuguese tradition of matchlocks. Indian craftsmen modified the design by introducing a very short, almost pistol-like buttstock held against the cheek, not the shoulder, when aiming. They also reduced the caliber and made the gun lighter and more balanced. This was a hit with the Portuguese who did a lot of fighting aboard ship and on river craft, and valued a more compact gun. The Malaccan gunfounders, compared as being in the same level with those of Germany, quickly adapted these new firearms, and thus a new type of arquebus, the istinggar, appeared. The Japanese did not acquire firearms until the 16th century, and then from the Portuguese rather than from the Chinese.

Developments in firearms accelerated during the 19th and 20th centuries. Breech-loading became more or less a universal standard for the reloading of most hand-held firearms and continues to be so with some notable exceptions (such as mortars). Instead of loading individual rounds into weapons, magazines holding multiple munitions were adopted—these aided rapid reloading. Automatic and semi-automatic firing mechanisms meant that a single soldier could fire many more rounds in a minute than a vintage weapon could fire over the course of a battle. Polymers and alloys in firearm construction made weaponry progressively lighter and thus easier to deploy. Ammunition changed over the centuries from simple metallic ball-shaped projectiles that rattled down the barrel to bullets and cartridges manufactured to high precision. Especially in the past century particular attention has focused on accuracy and sighting to make firearms altogether far more accurate than ever before. More than any single factor though, firearms have proliferated due to the advent of mass production—enabling arms-manufacturers to produce large quantities of weaponry to a consistent standard.

Velocities of bullets increased with the use of a "jacket" of metals such as copper or copper alloys that covered a lead core and allowed the bullet to glide down the barrel more easily than exposed lead. Such bullets are designated as "full metal jacket" (FMJ). Such FMJ bullets are less likely to fragment on impact and are more likely to traverse through a target while imparting less energy. Hence, FMJ bullets impart less tissue damage than non-jacketed bullets that expand. This led to their adoption for military use by countries adhering to the Hague Convention of 1899.

That said, the basic principle behind firearm operation remains unchanged to this day. A musket of several centuries ago is still similar in principle to a modern-day rifle—using the expansion of gases to propel projectiles over long distances—albeit less accurately and rapidly.

Evolution

Early models

Fire lances

The Chinese fire lance from the 10th century was the direct predecessor to the modern concept of the firearm. It was not a gun itself, but an addition to soldiers' spears. Originally it consisted of paper or bamboo barrels that would contain incendiary gunpowder that could be lit one time and which would project flames at the enemy. Sometimes Chinese troops would place small projectiles within the barrel that would also be projected when the gunpowder was lit, but most of the explosive force would create flames. Later, the barrel was changed to be made of metal, so that more explosive gunpowder could be used and put more force into the propulsion of projectiles.

Hand cannons

The original predecessors of all firearms, the Chinese fire lance and hand cannon, were loaded with gunpowder and the shot (initially lead shot, later replaced by cast iron) through the muzzle, while a fuse was placed at the rear. This fuse was lit, causing the gunpowder to ignite and propel the projectiles. In military use, the standard hand cannon was tremendously powerful, while also being somewhat erratic due to the relative inability of the gunner to aim the weapon, or to control the ballistic properties of the projectile. Recoil could be absorbed by bracing the barrel against the ground using a wooden support, the forerunner of the stock. Neither the quality nor amount of gunpowder, nor the consistency in projectile dimensions was controlled, with resulting inaccuracy in firing due to windage, variance in gunpowder composition, and the difference in diameter between the bore and the shot. Hand cannons were replaced by lighter carriage-mounted artillery pieces, and ultimately by the arquebus.

In the 1420s, gunpowder was used to propel missiles from hand-held tubes during the Hussite revolt in Bohemia.

Muskets

Muzzle-loading muskets (smooth-bored long guns) were among the first firearms developed. The firearm was loaded through the muzzle with gunpowder, optionally with some wadding, and then with a bullet (usually a solid lead ball, but musketeers could shoot stones when they ran out of bullets). Greatly improved muzzleloaders (usually rifled instead of smooth-bored) are manufactured today and have many enthusiasts, many of whom hunt large and small game with their guns. Muzzleloaders have to be manually reloaded after each shot; a skilled archer could fire multiple arrows faster than most early muskets could be reloaded and fired, although by the mid-18th century when muzzleloaders became the standard small-armament of the military, a well-drilled soldier could fire six rounds in a minute using prepared cartridges in his musket. Before then, the effectiveness of muzzleloaders was hindered both by the low reloading speed and, before the firing mechanism was perfected, by the very high risk posed by the firearm to the person attempting to fire it.

One interesting solution to the reloading problem was the "Roman Candle Gun" with superposed loads. This was a muzzleloader in which multiple charges and balls were loaded one on top of the other, with a small hole in each ball to allow the subsequent charge to be ignited after the one ahead of it was ignited. It was neither a very reliable nor popular firearm, but it enabled a form of "automatic" fire long before the advent of the machine gun.

Loading techniques

Most early firearms were muzzle-loading. This form of loading has several disadvantages, such as a slow rate of fire and having to expose oneself to enemy fire to reload—as the weapon had to be pointed upright so the powder could be poured through the muzzle into the breech, followed by the ramming the projectile into the breech. As effective methods of sealing the breech developed along with sturdy, weatherproof, self-contained metallic cartridges, muzzle-loaders were replaced by single-shot breech loaders. Eventually, single-shot weapons were replaced by the following repeater-type weapons.

Internal magazines

Many firearms made from the late-19th century through the 1950s used internal magazines to load the cartridge into the chamber of the weapon. The most notable and revolutionary weapons of this period appeared during the U.S. Civil War of 1861–1865: the Spencer and Henry repeating rifles. Both used fixed tubular magazines, the former having the magazine in the buttstock and the latter under the barrel, which allowed a larger capacity. Later weapons used fixed box magazines that could not be removed from the weapon without disassembling the weapon itself. Fixed magazines permitted the use of larger cartridges and eliminated the hazard of having the bullet of one cartridge butting next to the primer or rim of another cartridge. These magazines are loaded while they are in the weapon, often using a stripper clip. A clip is used to transfer cartridges into the magazine. Some notable weapons that use internal magazines include the Mosin–Nagant, the Mauser Kar 98k, the Springfield M1903, the M1 Garand, and the SKS. Firearms that have internal magazines are usually, but not always, rifles. Some exceptions to this include the Mauser C96 pistol, which uses an internal magazine, and the Breda 30, an Italian light machine gun.

Detachable magazines
Many modern firearms use what are called detachable or box magazines as their method of chambering a cartridge. Detachable magazines can be removed from the weapon without disassembling the firearms, usually by pushing a magazine release.

Belt-fed weapons

A belt or ammunition belt, a device used to retain and feed cartridges into a firearm, is commonly used with machine guns. Belts were originally composed of canvas or cloth with pockets spaced evenly to allow the belt to be mechanically fed into the gun. These designs were prone to malfunctions due to the effects of oil and other contaminants altering the belt. Later belt-designs used permanently-connected metal links to retain the cartridges during feeding. These belts were more tolerant to exposure to solvents and oil. Notable weapons that use belts include the M240, the M249, the M134 Minigun, and the PK Machine Gun.

Firing mechanisms

Matchlock

Matchlocks were the first and simplest firearms-firing mechanisms developed. In the matchlock mechanism, the powder in the gun barrel was ignited by a piece of burning cord called a "match". The match was wedged into one end of an S-shaped piece of steel. When the trigger (often actually a lever) was pulled, the match was brought into the open end of a "touch hole" at the base of the gun barrel, which contained a very small quantity of gunpowder, igniting the main charge of gunpowder in the gun barrel. The match usually had to be relit after each firing. The main parts of the matchlock firing mechanism are the pan, match, arm, and trigger. A benefit of the pan and arm swivel being moved to the side of the gun was it gave a clear line of fire. An advantage to the matchlock firing mechanism is that it did not misfire. However, it also came with some disadvantages. One disadvantage involved weather: in rain, the match could not be kept lit to fire the weapon.  Another issue with the match was it could give away the position of soldiers because of the glow, sound, and smell. While European pistols were equipped with wheellock and flintlock mechanisms, Asian pistols used matchlock mechanisms.

Wheellock

The wheellock action, a successor to the matchlock, predated the flintlock. Despite its many faults, the wheellock was a significant improvement over the matchlock in terms of both convenience and safety, since it eliminated the need to keep a smoldering match in proximity to loose gunpowder. It operated using a small wheel (much like that on a cigarette lighter) which was wound up with a key before use and which, when the trigger was pulled, spun against a flint, creating the shower of sparks that ignited the powder in the touch hole. Supposedly invented by Leonardo da Vinci (1452–1519), the Italian Renaissance man, the wheellock action was an innovation that was not widely adopted due to the high cost of the clockwork mechanism.

Flintlock

The flintlock action represented a major innovation in firearm design. The spark used to ignite the gunpowder in the touch hole came from a sharpened piece of flint clamped in the jaws of a "cock" which, when released by the trigger, struck a piece of steel called the "frizzen" to generate the necessary sparks. (The spring-loaded arm that holds a piece of flint or pyrite is referred to as a cock because of its resemblance to a rooster.) The cock had to be manually reset after each firing, and the flint had to be replaced periodically due to wear from striking the frizzen. (See also flintlock mechanism, snaphance, Miquelet lock.) The flintlock was widely used during the 17th, 18th, and 19th centuries in both muskets and rifles.

Percussion cap

Percussion caps (caplock mechanisms), coming into wide service in the early 19th century, offered a dramatic improvement over flintlocks. With the percussion-cap mechanism, the small primer charge of gunpowder used in all preceding firearms was replaced by a completely self-contained explosive charge contained in a small brass "cap". The cap was fastened to the touch hole of the gun (extended to form a "nipple") and ignited by the impact of the gun's "hammer". (The hammer is roughly the same as the cock found on flintlocks except that it does not clamp onto anything.) In the case of percussion caps the hammer was hollow on the end to fit around the cap in order to keep the cap from fragmenting and injuring the shooter.

Once struck, the flame from the cap, in turn, ignited the main charge of gunpowder, as with the flintlock, but there was no longer any need to charge the touch hole with gunpowder, and even better, the touch hole was no longer exposed to the elements. As a result, the percussion-cap mechanism was considerably safer, far more weatherproof, and vastly more reliable (cloth-bound cartridges containing a pre-measured charge of gunpowder and a ball had been in regular military service for many years, but the exposed gunpowder in the entry to the touch hole had long been a source of misfires). All muzzleloaders manufactured since the second half of the 19th-century use percussion caps except those built as replicas of the flintlock or earlier firearms.

Cartridges

Frenchman Louis-Nicolas Flobert invented the first rimfire metallic cartridge in 1845. His cartridge consisted of a percussion cap with a bullet attached to the top. Flobert then made what he called "parlor guns" for this cartridge, as these rifles and pistols were designed to be shot in indoor shooting-parlors in large homes. These 6mm Flobert cartridges do not contain any powder, the only propellant substance contained in the cartridge is the percussion cap. In English-speaking countries, the 6mm Flobert cartridge corresponds to .22 BB Cap and .22 CB Cap ammunition. These cartridges have a relatively low muzzle-velocity of around 700 ft/s (210 m/s).

Cartridges represented a major innovation: firearms ammunition, previously delivered as separate bullets and powder, was combined in a single metallic (usually brass) cartridge containing a percussion cap, powder, and a bullet in one weatherproof package. The main technical advantage of the brass cartridge case was the effective and reliable sealing of high-pressure gasses at the breech, as the gas pressure forces the cartridge case to expand outward, pressing it firmly against the inside of the gun-barrel chamber.  This prevents the leakage of hot gas which could injure the shooter. The brass cartridge also opened the way for modern repeating arms, by uniting the bullet, gunpowder, and primer into one assembly that could be fed reliably into the breech by mechanical action in the firearm.

Before this, a "cartridge" was simply a pre-measured quantity of gunpowder together with a ball in a small cloth bag (or rolled paper cylinder), which also acted as wadding for the charge and ball. This early form of cartridge had to be rammed into the muzzleloader's barrel, and either a small charge of gunpowder in the touch hole or an external percussion cap mounted on the touch hole ignited the gunpowder in the cartridge. Cartridges with built-in percussion caps (called "primers") continue to this day to be the standard in firearms. In cartridge-firing firearms, a hammer (or a firing pin struck by the hammer) strikes the cartridge primer, which then ignites the gunpowder within. The primer charge is at the base of the cartridge, either within the rim (a "rimfire" cartridge) or in a small percussion cap embedded in the center of the base (a "centerfire" cartridge). As a rule, centerfire cartridges are more powerful than rimfire cartridges, operating at considerably higher pressures than rimfire cartridges. Centerfire cartridges are also safer, as a dropped rimfire cartridge has the potential to discharge if its rim strikes the ground with sufficient force to ignite the primer. This is practically impossible with most centerfire cartridges.

Nearly all contemporary firearms load cartridges directly into their breech. Some additionally or exclusively load from a magazine that holds multiple cartridges. A magazine is defined as a part of the firearm which exists to store ammunition and to assist in its feeding by the action into the breech (such as through the rotation of a revolver's cylinder or by spring-loaded platforms in most pistol and rifle designs). Some magazines, such as that of most centerfire hunting rifles and all revolvers, are internal to and inseparable from the firearm, and are loaded by using a "clip".  A clip (the term often mistakingly refers to a detachable "magazine") is a device that holds the ammunition by the rim of the case and is designed to assist the shooter in reloading the firearm's magazine. Examples include revolver speedloaders, the stripper clip used to aid loading rifles such as the Lee–Enfield or Mauser 98, and the en-bloc clip used in loading the M1 Garand. In this sense, "magazines" and "clips", though often used synonymously, refer to different types of devices.

Repeating, semi-automatic, and automatic firearms

Many firearms are "single shot": i.e., each time a cartridge is fired, the operator must manually re-cock the firearm and load another cartridge. The classic single-barreled shotgun offers a good example. A firearm that can load multiple cartridges as the firearm is re-cocked is considered a "repeating firearm" or simply a "repeater". A lever-action rifle, a pump-action shotgun, and most bolt-action rifles are good examples of repeating firearms. A firearm that automatically re-cocks and reloads the next round with each trigger-pull is considered a semi-automatic or autoloading firearm.

The first "rapid firing" firearms were usually similar to the 19th-century Gatling gun, which would fire cartridges from a magazine as fast as and as long as the operator turned a crank. Eventually, the "rapid" firing mechanism was perfected and miniaturized to the extent that either the recoil of the firearm or the gas pressure from firing could be used to operate it, thus the operator needed only to pull a trigger—this made the firing mechanisms truly "automatic". An automatic (or "fully automatic") firearm automatically re-cocks, reloads, and fires as long as the trigger is depressed. An automatic firearm is capable of firing multiple rounds with one pull of the trigger. The Gatling gun may have been the first automatic weapon, though the modern trigger-actuated machine gun was not widely introduced until the First World War (1914–1918) with the German "Spandau" (adopted in 1908) and the British Lewis gun (in service from 1914). Automatic rifles such as the Browning Automatic Rifle were in common use by the military during the early part of the 20th century, and automatic rifles that fired handgun rounds, known as submachine guns, also appeared at this time. Many modern military firearms have a selective fire option, which is a mechanical switch that allows the firearm to be fired either in the semi-automatic or fully automatic mode. In the current M16A2 and M16A4 variants of the U.S.-made M16, continuous fully-automatic fire is not possible, having been replaced by an automatic burst of three cartridges (this conserves ammunition and increases controllability).

Automatic weapons are largely restricted to military and paramilitary organizations, though many automatic designs are infamous for their use by civilians.

Health hazards

Firearm hazard is quite notable, with a significant impact on the health system. In 2001, for quantification purposes, it was estimated that the cost of fatalities and injuries was US$4700 million per year in Canada (US$170 per Canadian) and US$100,000 million per year in the U.S. (US$300 per American).

Death

From 1990 to 2015, global deaths from assault by firearm rose from 128,000 to 173,000, however this represents a drop in rate from 2.41/100,000 to 2.35/100,000, as world population has increased by more than two billion.

In 2017, there were 39,773 gun-related deaths in the United States; over 60% were suicides from firearms. In 2001, firearms were involved in cases constituting the second leading cause of "mechanism of injury deaths" (which are deaths which occur as a direct, identifiable, and immediate consequence of an event, such as a shooting or poisoning, and do not include deaths due to "natural causes" or "indirect causes" such as chronic alcohol abuse or tobacco use) after motor vehicle accidents, which comprised the majority of deaths in this category. The most recent, complete data, from 2017, shows gunshot related homicides as having been the 31st most common cause of death in the US, while gunshot related suicides was the 21st most common cause of death. Accidental discharge of a firearm accounted for the 59th most common cause of death, with 486 deaths in 2017, while 616 individuals were killed by law enforcement, comprising the 58th most common cause of death. The total number of deaths related to firearms in 2017 was 38,882 (not including incidents of deaths resulting from lethal force when used by law enforcement), while the most common cause of death, heart disease, claimed 647,457 lives, over sixteen times that of firearms, including suicides. The most recent data from the CDC, from 2020, shows that deaths involving firearms accounted for about 0.2% of all deaths nationwide in 2020, of which about two-thirds were suicides.

In the 52 high- and middle-income countries, with a combined population of 1,400 million and not engaged in civil conflict, fatalities due to firearm injuries were estimated at 115,000 people per annum, in the 1990s.

In those 52 countries, a firearm is the first method used for homicide (two-thirds) but only the second method for suicide (20%)

To prevent unintentional injury, gun safety training includes education on proper firearm storage and firearm-handling etiquette.

Injury
Based on US data, it is estimated that three people are injured for one killed.

Noise
A common hazard of repeated firearm use is noise-induced hearing loss (NIHL). NIHL can result from long-term exposure to noise or from high intensity impact noises such as gunshots. Individuals who shoot guns often have a characteristic pattern of hearing loss referred to as "shooters ear". They often have a high-frequency loss with better hearing in the low frequencies and one ear is typically worse than the other. The ear on the side the shooter is holding the gun will receive protection from the sound wave from the shoulder while the other ear remains unprotected and more susceptible to the full impact of the sound wave.

The intensity of a gunshot does vary; lower caliber guns are typically on the softer side while higher caliber guns are often louder. The intensity of a gunshot though typically ranges from 140 dB to 175 dB. Indoor shooting also causes loud reverberations which can also be as damaging as the actual gunshot itself. According to the National Institute on Deafness and Other Communication Disorders, noise above 85 dB can begin to cause hearing loss. While many sounds cause damage over time, at the intensity level of a gunshot (140 dB or louder), damage to the ear can occur instantly.

Shooters use custom hearing protection such as electronic type hearing protection for hunters which can amplify soft sounds like leaves crunching while reducing the intensity of the gunshot and custom hearing protection for skeet shooting.

Even with hearing protection, due to the high intensity of the noise guns produce shooters still develop hearing loss over time.

Legal definitions
Firearms include a variety of ranged weapons and there is no agreed-upon definition. For instance, English language laws of big legal entities such as the United States, India, the European Union and Canada use different definitions. Other English language definitions are provided by international treaties.

United States
In the United States, under 26 USC § 5845 (a), the term "firearm" means 

This is the ATF definition of a title II "NFA firearm", as defined by the National Firearms Act, and not the definition of a title I firearm, which includes firearms not restricted by the NFA. ATF forms dealing with Title II weapons all state the above-mentioned information, however, the above information is only applicable for the purposes of those forms. For practical purposes, a firearm, in the U.S., is defined as the part of a weapon- designed to use expanded gas caused by the combustion of explosive material, to propel a projectile- which houses the fire control group (trigger & sear).

According to the U.S. Bureau of Alcohol, Tobacco, Firearms and Explosives, if gas pressurization is achieved through mechanical gas compression rather than through chemical propellant combustion, then the device is technically an air gun, not a firearm.

India
In India, the arms act, 1959, provides a definition of firearms where "firearms" means arms of any description designed or adapted to discharge a projectile or projectiles of any kind by the action of any explosive or other forms of energy, and includes:

European Union
In the European Union, a European Directive amended by EU directive 2017/853 set minimum standards regarding civilian firearms acquisition and possession that EU member states must implement into their national legal systems. In this context, since 2017, firearms are considered as "any portable barrelled weapon that expels, is designed to expel or may be converted to expel a shot, bullet or projectile by the action of a combustible propellant". For legal reasons, objects can be considered a firearm if they have the appearance of a firearm or are made in a way that makes it possible to convert them to a firearm. Member states may be allowed to exclude from their gun control law items such as antique weapons, or specific purposes items that can only be used for that sole purpose.

United Kingdom
In the UK, a firearm does not have to use a combustible propellant, as explained by Crown Prosecution Service Guidance Firearms The Firearms Act 1968 Section 57(1B), uses the definition of a firearm as a "lethal barrelled weapon" as a "barrelled weapon of any description from which a shot, bullet or other missile, with kinetic energy of more than one joule as measured at the muzzle of the weapon, can be discharged". As such, low-energy air rifles and pistols also fall under UK firearm legislation, although the licensing requirements of low-energy weapons are more relaxed.

Canada
In Canada, firearms are defined by the Criminal Code:

Australia

Australia has a definition of firearms in its 1996 legal act:

South Africa
In South Africa, Firearms Control Act [No. 60 of 2000] defines firearms since June 2001, with a 2006 amendment of the definition:

International treaties

An inter-American convention defines firearms as:

An international UN protocol on firearms considers that

See also

References

Sources

 .
 
 
 
 

Firearms
Weapons
Projectile weapons
Chinese inventions
Gunpowder